{{Infobox song
| name     = Shoot to Thrill
| cover    =
| alt      =
| type     =
| artist   = AC/DC
| album    = Back in Black
| released = 25 July 1980
| recorded = April – May 1980
| studio   = Compass Point (Nassau)
| venue    =
| genre    = Hard rock
| length   = 5:17
| label    = 
 Albert
 Atlantic
| writer   = 
 Angus Young
 Malcolm Young
 Brian Johnson
| producer = Robert John "Mutt" Lange
| tracks   = {{Hidden
 | title = 10 tracks
 | text  = 
Side one
 "Hells Bells"
 "Shoot to Thrill"
 "What Do You Do for Money Honey"
 "Given the Dog a Bone"
 "Let Me Put My Love into You"
Side two
 "Back in Black"
 "You Shook Me All Night Long"
 "Have a Drink on Me"
 "Shake a Leg"
 "Rock and Roll Ain't Noise Pollution"
}}
}}

"Shoot to Thrill" is a song by Australian hard rock band AC/DC. It is the second track on the 1980 album Back in Black. This song is also the second track of AC/DC Live and AC/DC Live: 2 CD Collector's Edition, and is included on the Iron Man 2 soundtrack. Although the studio version was never released as a single, the song is a fan favourite and a staple on classic rock radio stations.

Music video
On 26 January 2010, a new music video for "Shoot to Thrill" was released with exclusive footage from the film Iron Man 2. The live concert footage used in the video was filmed in December 2009 at a concert in Buenos Aires, Argentina at the Estadio Monumental, from which the Live at River Plate DVD was filmed.

Live recordings

Several different live recordings of "Shoot to Thrill" have been released officially. One version, recorded from the Razors Edge World Tour, was released on the 1992 Live album. Another version, recorded from the 1991 Donington show, was released on the deluxe edition of the 2009 box set Backtracks. Another performance, recorded at River Plate Stadium in Buenos Aires in December 2009, was released as a limited edition 7-inch single (backed with a live performance of "War Machine" from the aforementioned show) for Record Store Day 2011, promoting the live DVD Live at River Plate, which was released in May 2011.

Meaning 
When explaining his lyrical inspiration for the song, lead singer and then-songwriter Brian Johnson recalled reading a British article about a neighbourhood pusher who made daily rounds (almost like a milkman) throughout the London suburbs, selling narcotics to bored, lonely and depressed housewives. These substance-affected homemakers would then peruse the local clubs and bars, seeking out torrid, extra-marital relationships.

Lead guitarist Angus Young has recently commented that the song's "break-down", which occurs soon after the main solo (a muted and repeating three chord sequence of A Major triad, G Major triad, and a D power chord leading up to a bombastic outro-solo), was inspired by the trio gun-battle climax from Sergio Leone's classic, Italian western The Good, the Bad and the Ugly. In this seminal scene, gun-fighters Clint Eastwood, Lee Van Cleef, and Eli Wallach stare one another down in the centre of a Civil-War cemetery for minutes-on-end to an eventual shoot-out.  Young said this sequence in the song was designed to mirror the actual soundtrack selection "Il Triello" by composer Ennio Morricone. Both compositions feature a slow quiet build-up, increasing in tension to a thunderous, cataclysmic finale.

Personnel
AC/DC
 Brian Johnson – lead vocals
 Angus Young – lead guitar
 Malcolm Young – rhythm guitar
 Cliff Williams – bass guitar
 Phil Rudd – drums

Production
 Robert John "Mutt" Lange – producer
 Tony Platt – engineer
 Benji Armbrister – engineer
 Jack Newber – engineer
 Brad Samuelsohn – mixing
 Bob Ludwig – mastering

Charts

Certifications

Cover versions 
The song has also been recorded by Halestorm on their EP Reanimate 2.0: The Covers.

Uses in media
This song has been used in several film and television programs including:

Two commercials for Call of Duty: Modern Warfare 3
Live-action commercial with Jonah Hill and Sam Worthington.
In-game footage commercial
Promotion for the film XXX: State of the Union.
TV promotion for the Will Ferrell movie Talladega Nights: The Ballad of Ricky Bobby.
The song appeared in the film adaption of The Dukes of Hazzard
In the intro of TV Argentine program, Caiga Quien Caiga
It appears in the first Iron Man 2 trailer and during the opening scenes of the movie. It is later reprised in 2012's The Avengers as a signature theme for Iron Man, playing when he joins Captain America in the fight against Loki in Stuttgart, Germany. The latter film's soundtrack was originally set to contain a cover of the song performed by Canadian rock band Theory of a Deadman, but it was removed for unknown reasons.
In the intro of the Brazilian version of the TV program, CQC, Custe o Que Custar
The live version was one of the two AC/DC theme songs to World Wrestling Entertainment's 25th Anniversary of WrestleMania event. The other was "War Machine" from Black Ice.
2010 advertisement for the National Basketball League Australia on television channel One HD.
The first trailer for the NFC North Battle 2010 videogame used the song with recorded audience in background.
The instrumental version was used in the Top Gear trailer for series 16.
The song's title has also been a popular use for many AC/DC tribute bands.
The song was used in the second trailer for RED 2.
 The song is used in the intro to the Peter Schiff Radio show.
 Episode 4 of Team Four Star's Hellsing Ultimate Abridged .
 The song was used in Zombieland: Double Tap.
 The song was used in the 2019 Netflix film Murder Mystery.

References

AC/DC songs
1980 songs
Song recordings produced by Robert John "Mutt" Lange
Songs about drugs
Songs based on actual events
Songs written by Angus Young
Songs written by Malcolm Young
Songs written by Brian Johnson
2011 singles
Live singles
Columbia Records singles
Music videos shot in Argentina